Falling in Love is a 1984 American romantic drama film directed by Ulu Grosbard, written by Michael Cristofer, and starring Robert De Niro and Meryl Streep. The film received mixed reviews, and was a box office bomb.

Plot
On Christmas Eve, commercial artist Molly Gilmore and architectural engineer Frank Raftis are last-minute Christmas shopping in Manhattan. Frank meets his colleague Ed for drinks; Ed tells Frank he is getting divorced. Molly sees her friend Isabelle, who is married, but plans to spend Christmas with another man; Molly also visits her sick father. Later that day, at the counter in a hectic bookstore, Frank and Molly get their packages mixed up, and on Christmas Day, Molly's husband, Brian, and Frank's wife, Ann, each opens the book that was meant for the other.

Three months later, Frank and Molly, who commute into Manhattan from adjacent stops on the Metro-North Hudson Line, run into each other on the morning train. They struggle to place each other, but eventually Frank remembers, and reminds her of the confusion over the books. Later that day, Frank's boss asks him to take a post in Houston. Molly visits her father in hospital. Molly tells Isabelle about Frank; Frank tells Ed about Molly. That evening, Frank waits for Molly at Grand Central Terminal. They talk, and agree to meet on the morning train later that week.

Against their better judgement, Frank and Molly grow closer. They see more and more of each other until, one afternoon, Frank takes Molly to Ed's apartment. They begin to make love, but Molly cannot go through with it. They agree that they must stop seeing each other.

When Molly returns home that day, Brian gives her the news that her father has died. At the funeral, she has a panic attack. Convalescing, she tells Isabelle that it isn't grief for her father that she is suffering, but the loss of Frank. Meanwhile, Frank agrees to take the job in Houston. He tells Ann about Molly, throwing the future of their marriage into question.

On the night he is due to leave, Frank calls Molly at home. Frank asks to see her before he goes, but as Brian stands listening, she ends the call. Unable to resist, she tells Brian she must see Frank one more time, and rushes to her car. Driving fast in the pouring rain, she nearly collides with a train at a crossing, and misses her chance. Meanwhile Frank tries to call her again but her husband answers the phone and says she doesn't want to talk to Frank.

Some time later, once more in the run up to Christmas, Frank meets Ed and tells him that he and Ann are now separated. Molly meets Isabelle, and it is clear from their conversation that her marriage to Brian has failed too. Frank makes a stop at the bookstore where he and Molly first met. Molly is there at the same time. They talk but, uncertain how things now stand between them, go their separate ways. Walking away from the store, Frank stops, turns, and runs after her. A short time later on a crowded train out of Grand Central, he finds her again. They embrace.

Cast

Reception
Critical response
As of August 2022, Falling in Love holds a rating of 54% on Rotten Tomatoes based on 13 reviews.

Awards and nominations

Filming locations
The entire film takes place in the New York City metropolitan area and suburbs. 
There are scenes in locations including Manhattan Place, Rizzoli Bookstore, the Hudson River train line, Englewood, New Jersey, and Dobbs Ferry, New York.

Trivia
The movie was remade in Hindi as Kabhi Alvida Naa Kehna, directed by Karan Johar on 2006.

References

External links
 

1984 films
Films scored by Dave Grusin
Films shot in New York City
Films set in New York City
Films directed by Ulu Grosbard
1984 romantic drama films
Paramount Pictures films
American romantic drama films
Films with screenplays by Michael Cristofer
1980s English-language films
1980s American films